Camouflage wz. 89 Puma was the successor of the Wz. 68 Moro pattern in  the Polish Armed Forces. Puma was first produced in 1989, and was replaced in 1993 by Wz. 93 Pantera.

Pattern

Camouflage wz. 89 Puma was introduced as the successor of Wz. 68 Moro. Unlike its predecessor, Puma was intended to have better camouflage parameters in Polish scenery. It was not very effective, with only two colors; at long range, soldiers wearing Puma stood out against a Polish forest background. Puma was soon replaced, after only 4 years, by the Pantera pattern.

Puma was applied to various military uniform models, and also to individual containers to replace the old Polish kostka..

References

Camouflage patterns
Military camouflage
Military equipment introduced in the 1980s